The twelfth season of the American animated television series Bob's Burgers debuted on Fox on September 26, 2021, and ended on May 22, 2022. Despite being the twelfth broadcast season of the show, production codes indicate that aside from one episode, the entire season consists of episodes from the eleventh production cycle ordered in May 2020.

Production
Despite being the twelfth broadcast season, the season so far has consisted mostly of episodes from the eleventh production cycle. Production of these episodes was minimally affected by lockdowns during the COVID-19 pandemic as some voice actors recorded parts from their homes in April 2020.

In December 2021, it was reported that Jay Johnston had been "banned" from his recurring role as Jimmy Pesto due to his alleged participation in the January 6 United States Capitol attack.

Critical Reception
Caleb from Bubbleblabber.com gave Season 12 a positive review, praising the season premiere and first half of the season, but criticized the latter halve.

Episodes

Release 
This season aired on Fox on Sundays as part of its Animation Domination block along with The Simpsons, The Great North, Duncanville, and Family Guy.
Starting with this season, the series runs on Disney+'s Star segment in Canada, UK and Australia, where episodes premiere weekly on Wednesdays.

Season 12 was released on DVD on July 19, 2022.

References

2021 American television seasons
2022 American television seasons
 Bob's Burgers seasons